Admiral Fetterman Field (located in the Community Maritime Park and also locally referred to as Blue Wahoos Stadium) is a multi-use park in Pensacola, Florida that includes a stadium, commercial buildings, a waterfront public park and amphitheater. The mixed use stadium holds 5,038 people and can be used for a number of events year-round, including baseball, soccer, football, festivals, graduations, and similar events. The multi-use stadium was originally designed to be the home field of the Pensacola Pelicans; it hosts the Miami Marlins Double-A affiliate, the Pensacola Blue Wahoos of the Southern League. The stadium is situated facing the Pensacola Bay.

History
On April 28, 2009, the Pensacola City Council gave final approval for the ballpark to be built.

The entire project cost $54 million and was completed in time for the Blue Wahoos' inaugural home opener on April 5, 2012.
Building the ballpark cost $23,845,045.23.

Admiral Fetterman Field description

Construction includes precast concrete bowl seating, steel framed elevated slabs, post-tensioned slabs-on-grade, and an auger cast pile foundation with concrete grade beams and pile caps. This project was custom designed to meet the needs for the use by a minor league baseball team as well as for accommodating other sporting and festival type events. The structure and slab-on-grade was pile supported due to poor soil conditions and concern over scour from hurricanes.

During steel fabrication and foundation construction, an AA baseball team was acquired. This acquisition required enhancements to the stadium. This was a challenge for the design team who worked diligently to adjust the structure while using newly constructed elements within the enhancements, while providing subcontractors information needed to keep construction moving forward without incurring additional mobilization fees.

Randall K. and Martha A. Hunter Amphitheater description 
The amphitheater has architecturally exposed steel trusses and frames supporting curved steel roof purlins with a heavy timber, tongue-and-groove roof deck. The steel trusses and frames are designed and shaped to resemble the fronds of a palm tree. The steel structure is supported on concrete piers that are supported on a large concrete pile cap that rests on auger-cast-in-place piles. The concrete piers also support the main stage floor.

UWF Football 
As of the 2016 season, the stadium hosts the West Florida Argonauts football team. On November 23, 2021, the Argonauts won a share of their first-ever Gulf South Conference football title at the stadium in a win over Valdosta State. On November 20, 2021, UWF hosted their first-ever home NCAA Division II playoff game at the venue.

References

External links

 City of Pensacola site for Blue Wahoos Stadium
 Pensacola Blue Wahoos

Minor league baseball venues
Sports venues in Pensacola, Florida
Soccer venues in Florida
Baseball venues in Florida
2012 establishments in Florida
Sports venues completed in 2012
American football venues in Florida
College football venues
West Florida Argonauts football
Populous (company) buildings
Southern League (1964–present) ballparks